Florida Media Quarterly is the official publication of the Florida Association for Media in Education.

Media studies journals
English-language journals
Quarterly journals
Publications with year of establishment missing